George Stuart Nixon (April 2, 1860 – June 5, 1912) was an American who served as a member of the United States Senate from Nevada.

Early life 
He was born in Newcastle, California. He went to work for a railroad company and studied telegraphy.

Career 
In 1881, Nixon was transferred to Nevada, where he organized and became cashier of a bank at Winnemucca. He also built an opera house in Reno, a theater in Winnemucca and was one of the financiers of the Mizpah Hotel in Tonopah, Nevada.

He became a member of the Nevada Assembly in 1891 and was elected to the U.S. Senate in 1905 as a Republican. He was re-elected in 1911 and served until his death in 1912. He was the chairman of the Committee on Coast Defenses.

On February 9, 1905, he joined the San Francisco Bohemian Club.

Death 
Nixon died in 1912 and was buried in the Masonic Cemetery in Reno. The Nevada Legislature chose William A. Massey as his successor. The town of Nixon, Nevada was named after George Nixon.

See also 
 List of United States Congress members who died in office (1900–49)

References

External links
 
 George S. Nixon, late a senator from Nevada, Memorial addresses delivered in the House of Representatives and Senate frontispiece 1913

1860 births
1912 deaths
Republican Party members of the Nevada Assembly
Republican Party United States senators from Nevada
People from Newcastle, California
People from Winnemucca, Nevada
19th-century American politicians